Atractus pauciscutatus, the little-scaled ground snake, is a species of snake in the family Colubridae. The species can be found in Peru.

References 

Atractus
Endemic fauna of Peru
Reptiles of Peru
Snakes of South America
Reptiles described in 1943
Taxa named by Karl Patterson Schmidt